Fanny Colonna (1934 - November 18, 2014) was a French-Algerian sociologist and anthropologist. She was also a former professor at Tizi Ouzou University.

Biography 
Colonna was born in El Milia, and was the daughter of a French civil servant "who made sure she learned Arabic." Colonna lived in Algeria until 1993. She "established her reputation with a study of the Algerian schoolteacher class during the colonial period." Colonna also conducted an ethnographic study in the Aures between 1970 and 1980.

Selected works

References 

1934 births
2014 deaths
French anthropologists
Algerian anthropologists
French women anthropologists
Algerian women anthropologists
Algerian sociologists
Algerian women sociologists
21st-century Algerian people